Moya Bailey is an African-American feminist scholar, writer, and activist. She is noted for coining the term misogynoir, which denotes what Bailey describes as the unique combination of misogyny and anti-black racism experienced by black women. Bailey is an associate professor at Northwestern University.

Career
Bailey attended Spelman College for her undergraduate degree. She received her doctoral degree from Emory University in the department of Women, Gender, and Sexuality Studies. After working at Northeastern University as an assistant professor in the Department of Cultures, Societies, and Global Studies and the program in Women's, Gender, and Sexuality Studies, she joined the Department of Communication Studies at Northwestern.

She works with the Octavia E. Butler Legacy Network, "an organization that supports and promotes the writer's legacy," and is the co-founder of Quirky Black Girls, a collective for black women who do not fit cultural stereotypes. She also worked on the project #tooFEW. The hashtag "FEW" stands for "Feminists Engage Wikipedia". The objective of this project was to have feminists engage Wikipedia pages, both adding and editing information regarding individuals, events and things regarding feminism (with a particular focus on Black feminism). She received backlash and derogatory comments for taking part in this initiative.

Misogynoir
Bailey originally coined the term misogynoir in 2008, but first used the term in a 2010 essay entitled "They aren't talking about me...". It is a portmanteau of the word misogyny and noir, the French word for 'black'. Bailey coined term to describe a unique type of discrimination experienced by black women, specifically the "anti-Black racist misogyny that black women experience, particularly in US visual and digital culture".

In a 2014 blog post she wrote:

Publications

References

Further reading

External links
Official website

Living people
African-American feminists
African-American philosophers
African-American women academics
21st-century American philosophers
American women academics
American women philosophers
Black studies scholars
Emory University alumni
Feminist philosophers
Northeastern University faculty
Northwestern University faculty
Queer theorists
Spelman College alumni
Year of birth missing (living people)